Arturo Hernández may refer to:

Arturo Hernández (lawyer), Puerto Rican attorney and gubernatorial candidate
Arturo Hernández (badminton) (born 1991), Mexican male badminton player
Arturo Estrada Hernández (born 1925), Mexican painter
Arturo Hernández Basave, Mexican diplomat